Pyrearinus candelarius is a species of click beetle (family Elateridae).

Description
The basic coloration is dark brown. The eyes are large and the pronotum is yellowish or pale brown, with a blackish area in the middle and small backward-pointing teeth. These beetles are bioluminescent by means of  two luminescent light organs at the posterior corners of the prothorax, emitting green light, and a large abdominal area on the first segment, emitting yellow light. They do not flash, they emit light continuously. Eggs and pupae are bioluminescent too.

Distribution
This species can be found in Argentina and Brazil.

References
  Elateridae in SYNOPSIS OF THE DESCRIBED COLEOPTERA OF THE WORLD
 Universal Biological Indexer
 Elateridae de Argentina
 Cleide Costa Systematics and evolution of the tribes Pyrophorini and Heligmini

Elateridae
Bioluminescent insects
Beetles described in 1841